WAXI (branded as "Super Hits 104.9") is a radio station serving the Terre Haute, Indiana area with a classic hits format. It broadcasts on FM frequency 104.9 MHz and is under ownership of David L. Crooks, through licensee DLC Media, Inc.

WAXI also airs Chicago Cubs baseball games during the Major League Baseball season. In July 2015, local radio icon Barry Kent took over as operations manager and as an on-air personality.

WAXI is also the acronym for the West African Exploration Initiative.

Previous logo

References

External links
WAXI - Official Website

West African Exploration Initiative 

AXI